Hippotion eson is a moth of the family Sphingidae. It is very common in most habitats throughout the Ethiopian Region, including Madagascar and the Seychelles. It is a migratory species.

References

 Pinhey, E. (1962): Hawk Moths of Central and Southern Africa. Longmans Southern Africa, Cape Town.

Hippotion
Moths described in 1779
Moths of Africa
Moths of the Comoros
Moths of Madagascar
Moths of Mauritius
Moths of Réunion
Moths of Seychelles